The 1991 Indianapolis Colts season was the 39th season for the team in the National Football League (NFL) and eighth in Indianapolis. The team was looking to improve on the 7–9 record they had recorded in 1990. Instead, the Colts put together a campaign that ranked as one of the worst in NFL history.

The Colts only recorded one victory in sixteen games, becoming the fourth team since the extension of the NFL's regular season to sixteen games to accomplish this. To date it is their worst full season record in the entire history of the franchise, and the second worst overall record in team history. The 1991 Colts’ futility was beaten only by the 1982 Baltimore Colts squad, where the team failed to record a victory in the strike-shortened season and finished at 0-8-1.

The Colts’ poor performance cost sixth-year head coach Ron Meyer his job after the Colts’ fifth consecutive loss to open the season. Meyer had been with the Colts since Week 14 in 1986, when he replaced the fired Rod Dowhower after the Colts had lost their first thirteen games of the season. Defensive coordinator Rick Venturi was promoted to interim head coach; he would lead the team to its only win, a one-point victory over the New York Jets on the road. The 1991 Colts are one of three 1-15 teams to win their lone game by one point; the others are the 1980 New Orleans Saints and 2000 San Diego Chargers.

The Colts scored the fewest points up to that point (143) of any team in NFL history in a sixteen-game schedule, scoring in the single digits in 11 games. The Colts never scored more than 28 points in any game (doing so in their lone victory), scored less than ten points eleven times, were shut out twice, and failed to score one single touchdown in nine of their sixteen games, which remains the largest proportion of games without scoring a touchdown since the 1977 “Zero Gang” Tampa Bay Buccaneers did not score a touchdown in eight of fourteen games. Statistics site Football Outsiders said of the Colts 1991 season:

Their futility was mentioned in a Thanksgiving edition of Bill Swerski's Superfans, a recurring Saturday Night Live sketch. The four characters, all Chicago Bears fans, commented on how some cities aren't as fortunate as Chicago to have a good football team, citing Indianapolis as an example. Coincidentally, six days before the skit aired, the Bears defeated the Colts 31–17 at Indianapolis. Ironically, however, the Colts would defeat the Bears in Super Bowl XLI, 15 years later.

Offseason

NFL Draft

Personnel

Staff

Roster

Regular season 
The Colts were victorious only once in the regular season, finishing last in the AFC East, and their fifteen losses tied an NFL record that was initially set by the 1980 New Orleans Saints and tied by the 1989 Dallas Cowboys and 1990 New England Patriots in the previous two NFL seasons. The 1991 Colts had a much weaker schedule to play than either the 1990 Patriots or 1989 Cowboys, playing eleven games against teams with non-winning records, as against only five for the 1990 Patriots and four for the 1989 Cowboys. The Colts lost nine consecutive games to start the season before rallying to defeat the playoff-bound New York Jets by a single point in Week 11. The win against their division rivals came at Giants Stadium; the Colts went 0–8 in the Hoosier Dome. (Incidentally, the Jets would become the next team to finish 1–15, doing so five years later.)

Since the Colts finished with the worst record in the NFL, they won the right to draft Steve Emtman, a defensive lineman from Washington whose career was derailed by injuries. It would take them until 1995 to reach the playoffs again, and the Colts did not become consistently successful until Peyton Manning joined the team near the end of the 1990s.

Schedule

Game summaries

Week 11: at New York Jets

Week 16

Jim Kelly and Frank Reich managed just thirteen completions, but four of them were touchdowns as the Bills romped 35–7. Jeff George was benched after completing just 83 yards and Mark Herrmann was even worse, throwing three interceptions. The win secured the #1 playoff seed for the Bills.

Standings

See also 
 History of the Indianapolis Colts
 List of Indianapolis Colts seasons
 Colts–Patriots rivalry

Notes

References 

Indianapolis Colts
Indianapolis Colts seasons
Colts